Loïc Amisse (born 9 August 1954) is a French football manager and former professional player who played as a winger.

External links

Profile on French federation site

Living people
1954 births
Footballers from Nantes
French footballers
France international footballers
Association football wingers
FC Nantes players
Angers SCO players
Ligue 1 players
Olympic footballers of France
Footballers at the 1976 Summer Olympics
French football managers
FC Nantes managers
Ligue 1 managers